RPM Racing (short for Radical Psycho Machine Racing) is a Super Nintendo Entertainment System racing game developed by Silicon & Synapse (now known as Blizzard Entertainment) and published by Interplay Productions.

RPM was a successful remake of the Commodore 64 video game Racing Destruction Set, developed by Electronic Arts in 1985. It claims to be the first American-developed game for the Super Nintendo Entertainment System. A spiritual successor, Rock n' Roll Racing, was released in 1993.

Gameplay
In the game, players can race in a regular season, a single race, or create their own course. The courses can be straight and oval, curvy and or hilly and unpredictable. The winner gets money and a chance to score their initials for the fastest time.

Development
RPM Racing was developed using the Sluggo development system created by Rebecca Heineman and her partner which allowed uploading of bin files to a device that emulated a cartridge for the SNES. System did not include step through or trace functionality. RPM was programmed in 65c816 Assembly Language (8088) using a cross compiler on an IBM computer.

Development took four months.

RPM was one of the first SNES games developed in 'High Resolution Graphics Mode' which allowed for sharper detail but fewer colors. While the higher resolution gave finer detail, it also severely limited the number of colors and amount of unique graphics that could be displayed from the SNES video memory. Due to this, the sequel to RPM, Rock n' Roll Racing, was developed in the lower resolution graphics mode allowing for much more vibrant colors and graphic detail.

The logic engine and track editor for RPM were ported from an older EA title Racing Destruction Set. The 5A22 8-Bit assembly code was modified for 16-bit but otherwise mostly left intact.

References

External links
 

1991 video games
Blizzard games
Interplay Entertainment games
Nintendo Switch games
Multiplayer and single-player video games
PlayStation 4 games
Racing video games
Super Nintendo Entertainment System games
Super Nintendo Entertainment System-only games
Vehicular combat games
Video games scored by George Sanger
Video games with isometric graphics
Windows games
Xbox One games
Video games developed in the United States